The Sangestar Tso, formerly called Shonga-tser Lake and popularly known as the Madhuri Lake, is located on the way from Tawang to Bum La Pass in Tawang district of Arunachal Pradesh, near Indo-China border above  above sea level.

Geography

The Taktsang Chu river that originates below the Takpo Shiri glacier to the north, flows through this region. The Taktsang Gompa is within the area,  to the west.

The Sangesstar Tso was created by falling rocks, boulders and trees in an earthquake.

Tourism

This is a really beautiful place. This location is off the beaten track for those who love roaming in the wilderness. It is a fantastic place for a picnic of a lifetime if you move out of Tawang by around 7am and carry in everything yourself.

Visit by civilian tourist of India is permissible with permission from the Indian Army. The track is very treacherous, only SUVs advisable, and that too only on clear weather day with no snowfall or rainfall.

Permit
A special permit is required to visit the Bum La Pass. Permits are requested at the Office of the Deputy Commissioner in Tawang District, and they are in the Indian army cantonment at the Tawang town. Without the army stamp, visitors are not allowed through the numerous check posts along the way.

Popular culture 
The lake was featured in a Madhuri Dixit (Bollywood actress) dance sequence in the movie Koyla, as a result of which it has come to be called the Madhuri lake.

Gallery

See also 
 Tawang Town
 Tawang Monastery
 Tawang district

References 

Lakes of Arunachal Pradesh
Tawang district
Lakes of India